The Bank of England £10 note, also known informally as a tenner, is a sterling banknote. It is the second-lowest denomination of banknote issued by the Bank of England. The current polymer note, first issued in 2017, bears the image of Queen Elizabeth II on the obverse and the image of author Jane Austen on the reverse. The final cotton paper note featuring a portrait of naturalist Charles Darwin, first issued in 2000, was withdrawn from circulation on 1 March 2018.

History
Ten pound notes were introduced by the Bank of England for the first time in 1759 as a consequence of gold shortages caused by the Seven Years' War. The earliest notes were handwritten, and were issued as needed to individuals. These notes were written on one side only and bore the name of the payee, the date, and the signature of the issuing cashier. With the exception of the Restriction period between 1797 and 1821, when the French Revolutionary Wars and the Napoleonic Wars caused a bullion shortage, these notes could be exchanged in full, or in part, for an equivalent amount of gold when presented at the bank. If redeemed in part, the banknote would be signed to indicate the amount that had been redeemed. From 1853 printed notes replaced handwritten notes, with the declaration "I promise to pay the bearer on demand the sum of ten pounds" replacing the name of the payee. This declaration remains on Bank of England banknotes to this day. A printed signature of one of three cashiers appeared on the printed notes, though this was replaced by the signature of the Chief Cashier from 1870 onwards.

The ability to redeem banknotes for gold ceased in 1931 when Britain stopped using the gold standard. The £10 note ceased to be produced by the Bank of England in 1943, and it was not until 1964 with the advent of the series C notes that the denomination was re-introduced. These brown notes were the first £10 notes to feature an image of the monarch on the front, and unlike the previous "White" notes they had a reverse; in this case featuring a lion. The C series was replaced by the D series beginning in 1975, with the new notes having a portrait of Florence Nightingale on the back. The tradition of portraying historical British figures on the reverse continued with the E series, first issued in 1992, with an image of Charles Dickens appearing. Series E notes are multicoloured, although they are predominantly orange-brown. From series E onward Bank of England £10 notes feature "windowed" metal thread; this thread appears as a dashed line, yet forms a single line when held up to the light.

The revised Series E £10 note was introduced in 2000. The note featured a number of security features in addition to the metallic thread, including raised print, a watermark, microlettering, a hologram, and a number ten which only appears under ultraviolet light. An F series £10 note was never issued.

Polymer note

In 2013, Mark Carney, Governor of the Bank of England, announced that a newly designed £10 banknote, in polymer, rather than cotton paper, and featuring early 19th-century novelist Jane Austen, would be issued. The date of issue was subsequently confirmed as 14 September 2017. The decision to replace Darwin with Austen followed a campaign to have a woman on the back of a Bank of England banknote when it was announced that the only woman to feature on the back of a note — prison reformer Elizabeth Fry on the £5 note — was to be replaced by Winston Churchill.

Like the £5 note featuring Churchill, the new £10 note is made from polymer rather than cotton paper. It depicts:

 The quotation "I declare after all there is no enjoyment like reading!" from Pride and Prejudice (Miss Bingley, Chapter XI). Austen's character Caroline Bingley, who says this in the novel, in fact has no interest in reading and is attempting to impress Mr Darcy, the book's romantic hero. 
 A portrait of Jane Austen, commissioned by James Edward Austen Leigh (Jane Austen's nephew) in 1870, which was adapted from an original sketch of Jane Austen drawn by her sister, Cassandra Austen.
 An illustration of Miss Elizabeth Bennet undertaking "the examination of all the letters which Jane had written to her"from a drawing by Isabel Bishop (1902–1988).
 An image of Godmersham Park, the home of Edward Austen Knight, Jane Austen's brother. Jane Austen visited the house often and it is believed that it was the inspiration for a number of her novels.
 Jane Austen's writing tablethe central design in the background is based on the twelve-sided writing table, and writing quills, used by Jane Austen at Chawton Cottage.

Winchester Cathedral, where Austen is buried, is depicted in gold foil on the front of the note and silver on the back. The note with serial number AA01001817 was donated to Winchester Cathedral, marking the year of Austen's burial, 1817.

Designs
Source: Bank of England

See also

Bank of England note issues

References

External links
Bank of England website
Polymer ten pound note website

Banknotes of England
Ten-base-unit banknotes
Cultural depictions of Jane Austen
Cultural depictions of Elizabeth II
Cultural depictions of Charles Darwin
Cultural depictions of Charles Dickens
Cultural depictions of Florence Nightingale